Park Street Collegiate Institute (PSCI) was a secondary school located in Orillia, Ontario, Canada. It was built in 1961 to help with the overflow of students from Orillia District Collegiate & Vocational Institute.  In March 2008, a review process was to have begun to consolidate Orillia's three public high schools into two buildings as a result of cost of maintenance of the aging buildings and the declining enrolment at PSCI.

Park Street had a capacity of 1011 students but, as of 2006, fewer than 900 students were enrolled.

On 28 November 2007, a bomb threat written on a mirror in a student washroom caused great concern and students were kept in classes in a school lockdown for the morning as police cleared the building room by room. Nothing suspicious was found and students returned to classes following an extended lunch break.

The school was closed and demolished in 2013, and a new school was planned to be built in its place to replace both Park Street Collegiate and Orillia District Collegiate & Vocational Institute.

Special programs

PSCI has a Construction Craft Program in Grade 11, partnership with the YMCA and CAPC for a Young Parent Education Support Program, Life Skills courses, Co-operative education program, and a private nursery school that links to parenting courses. Other programs include: a Latin program, full music, art and drama programs, electronics, transportation, construction, yearbook, manufacturing, drafting, model construction, and computer technology.

Extracurricular activities
Park Street Collegiate participates in Blood Donor Clinics, Take our Kids to Work Day, OPP Youth Liaison Project, Whiteball volleyball tournament, Kiwanis Big Sister Basketball Championship, Blackball Tournaments, Kiwanis Music Festival, and Sir Sam Steele Gallery.
The Technical Program provides assistance for community projects and are setting up a partnership between Habitat for Humanity and the Construction Craft program.
 Students' Administrative Council is in charge of dances, Winter Carnival, Hallowe'en and Christmas activities, Staff-Grad Baseball, Semi-formal and Formal, and the Grad Luncheon.
 Park Athletic Council is in charge of all sport-related activities, including organizing support officials for games, running buy-ins, and selling school spirit clothes.
 Cabaret - School's musical which is presented at the Orillia Opera House annually.
 Gay Straight Alliance - a club meant to break down the walls between heterosexuals and homosexuals in the student population.
 Fund Raising: PSCI raises funds annually to support Green Haven Shelter, Terry Fox Run, The Salvation Army, a foster child, respond to needs overseas, and provide support for those in need in the community. In January, 2007, Grade 10 Civics students organised to win a $5000 donation to the Orillia Food Bank from the Toskan-Casale Foundation through the Youth and Philanthropy Initiative and in December, 2007, the Peer Leadership class ran a four-day silent auction to raise money for the Orillia Food Bank.
Operation Knapsack: Students donate left-over school supplies at the end of the school year to children in developing countries.

Sport
 Boys'/Girls' Hockey, Boys'/Girls' Soccer, Boys'/Girls' Rugby, Boys'/Girls' Basketball, Boys'/Girls' Golf, Boys'/Girls' Volleyball, Track & Field, Badminton, Tennis, Boys' Football, Girls' Flag Football

Notable alumni
Bruce Stanton, Member of Parliament for Simcoe North (2006-present)
Don Tapscott, author and consultant
Marnie Woodrow, novelist and screenwriter
John Willsey, curler

Notable faculty
Don Tapscott, Sr., (1919–2006) music composer

See also
List of high schools in Ontario

References

External links
Park Street Collegiate at Simcoe County DSB
EQAO School Reports

High schools in Simcoe County
Educational institutions established in 1961
Educational institutions disestablished in 2013
Buildings and structures in Orillia
1961 establishments in Ontario
2013 disestablishments in Ontario